Isaura Gonçalo Ferrão Nyusi (born October 2, 1962) is a Mozambican civil servant and educator who has served as the First Lady of Mozambique since January 15, 2015, as the wife of President Filipe Nyusi. 

Nyusi became the President of the Organization of Mozambican Women (OMM), the women's political arm of FRELIMO, on February 11, 2016.

References

Living people
1962 births
First ladies of Mozambique
21st-century Mozambican women politicians
21st-century Mozambican politicians
People from Tete Province
FRELIMO politicians